The Pullman Strike was two interrelated strikes in 1894 that shaped national labor policy in the United States during a period of deep economic depression. First came a strike by the American Railway Union (ARU) against the Pullman factory in Chicago in spring 1894. When it failed, the ARU launched a national boycott against all trains that carried Pullman passenger cars. The nationwide railroad boycott that lasted from May 11 to July 20, 1894, was a turning point for US labor law. It pitted the American Railway Union (ARU) against the Pullman Company, the main railroads, the main labor unions, and the federal government of the United States under President Grover Cleveland. The strike and boycott shut down much of the nation's freight and passenger traffic west of Detroit, Michigan. The conflict began in Chicago, on May 11 when nearly 4,000 factory employees of the Pullman Company began a wildcat strike in response to recent reductions in wages. Most of the factory workers who built Pullman cars lived in the "company town" of Pullman just outside of Chicago. It was designed as a model community by its namesake founder and owner George Pullman.

As the Panic of 1893 weakened much of the economy, railroad companies ceased purchasing new passenger cars made by Pullman. When his company laid off workers and lowered wages, it did not reduce rents, and the workers called for a strike. Among the reasons for the strike were the absence of democracy within the town of Pullman and its politics, the rigid paternalistic control of the workers by the company, excessive water and gas rates, and a refusal by the company to allow workers to buy and own houses. They had not yet formed a union. Founded in 1893 by Eugene V. Debs, the American Railway Union (ARU) was an organization of railroad workers. Debs brought in ARU organizers to Pullman and signed up many of the disgruntled factory workers. When the Pullman Company refused recognition of the ARU or any negotiations, ARU called a strike against the factory, but it showed no sign of success. To win the strike, Debs decided to stop the movement of Pullman cars on railroads. The over-the-rail Pullman employees (such as conductors and porters) did not go on strike.

Debs and the ARU called a massive boycott against all trains that carried a Pullman car. It affected most rail lines west of Detroit and at its peak involved some 250,000 workers in 27 states. The American Federation of Labor (AFL) opposed the boycott because the ARU was trying to take its membership. The high prestige railroad brotherhoods of Conductors and Engineers were opposed to the boycott. The Fireman brotherhood—of which Debs had been a prominent leader—was split. The General Managers' Association of the railroads coordinated the opposition. Thirty people were killed in riots in Chicago alone. Historian David Ray Papke, building on the work of Almont Lindsey published in 1942, estimated another 40 were killed in other states. Property damage exceeded $80 million.

Local responses

The strike affected hundreds of towns and cities across the country. Railroad workers were divided, for the old established Brotherhoods, which included the skilled workers such as engineers, firemen and conductors, did not support the labor action. ARU members did support the action, and often comprised unskilled ground crews. In many areas townspeople and businessmen generally supported the railroads while farmers—many affiliated with the Populists—supported the ARU.

In Billings, Montana, an important rail center, a local Methodist minister, J. W. Jennings, supported the ARU. In a sermon he compared the Pullman boycott to the Boston Tea Party, and attacked Montana state officials and President Cleveland for abandoning "the faith of the Jacksonian fathers." Rather than defending "the rights of the people against aggression and oppressive corporations," he said party leaders were "the pliant tools of the codfish monied aristocracy who seek to dominate this country."  Billings remained quiet but on July 10, soldiers reached Lockwood, Montana, a small rail center, where the troop train was surrounded by hundreds of angry strikers. Narrowly averting violence, the army opened the lines through Montana.  When the strike ended, the railroads fired and blacklisted all the employees who had supported it.

In California the boycott was effective in Sacramento, a labor stronghold, but weak in the Bay Area and minimal in Los Angeles. The strike lingered as strikers expressed longstanding grievances over wage reductions, and indicate how unpopular the Southern Pacific Railroad was. Strikers engaged in violence and sabotage; the companies saw it as  civil war while the ARU proclaimed it was a crusade for the rights of unskilled workers.

Public opinion

President Cleveland did not think Illinois Governor John Peter Altgeld could manage the strike as it continued to cause more and more physical and economic damage.  Altgeld's pro-labor mindset and social reformist sympathies were viewed by outsiders as being a form of ‘German Socialism’. Critics of Altgeld worried that he was usually on the side of the workers. Outsiders also believed that the strike would get progressively worse since Altgeld, "Knew nothing about the problem of American evolution." Public opinion was mostly opposed to the strike and supported Cleveland's actions. Republicans and eastern Democrats supported Cleveland (the leader of the northeastern pro-business wing of the party), but southern and western Democrats as well as Populists generally denounced him. Chicago Mayor John Patrick Hopkins supported the strikers and stopped the Chicago Police from interfering before the strike turned violent. Governor Altgeld, a Democrat, denounced Cleveland and said he could handle all disturbances in his state without federal intervention. The press took the side of Cleveland and framed strikers as villains, while Mayor Hopkins took the side of strikers and Altgeld. The New York Times and Chicago Tribune placed much of the blame for the strikes on Altgeld.

Media coverage was extensive and generally negative. News reports and editorials commonly depicted the strikers as foreigners who contested the patriotism expressed by the militias and troops involved, as numerous recent immigrants worked in the factories and on the railroads. The editors warned of mobs, aliens, anarchy, and defiance of the law. The New York Times called it "a struggle between the greatest and most important labor organization and the entire railroad capital." President Cleveland and the press feared that the strike would foment anarchy and social unrest. Cleveland demonized the ARU for encouraging an uprising against federal authority and endangering the public. The large numbers of immigrant workers who participated in the strike further stoked the fears of anarchy. In Chicago the established church leaders denounced the boycott, but some younger Protestant ministers defended it.

Aftermath
Debs was arrested on federal charges, including conspiracy to obstruct the mail as well as disobeying an order directed to him by the Supreme Court to stop the obstruction of railways and to dissolve the boycott. He was defended by Clarence Darrow, a prominent attorney, as well as Lyman Trumbull. At the conspiracy trial Darrow argued that it was the railways, not Debs and his union, that met in secret and conspired against their opponents. Sensing that Debs would be acquitted, the prosecution dropped the charge when a juror took ill. Although Darrow also represented Debs at the United States Supreme Court for violating the federal injunction, Debs was sentenced to six months in prison.

Early in 1895, General Graham erected a memorial obelisk in the San Francisco National Cemetery at the Presidio in honor of four soldiers of the 5th Artillery killed in a Sacramento train crash of July 11, 1894, during the strike.  The train wrecked crossing a trestle bridge purportedly dynamited by union members.  Graham's monument included the inscription, "Murdered by Strikers", a description he hotly defended.  The obelisk remains in place.

In the aftermath of the Pullman Strike, the state ordered the company to sell off its residential holdings.  In the decades after Pullman died (1897), Pullman became just another South Side neighborhood. It remained the area's largest employer before closing in the 1950s.  The area is both a National Historic Landmark as well as a Chicago Landmark District.  Because of the significance of the strike, many state agencies and non-profit groups are hoping for many revivals of the Pullman neighborhoods starting with Pullman Park, one of the largest projects.  It was to be a $350 million mixed used development on the site of an old steel plant.  The plan was for 670,000 square feet of new retail space, 125,000 square foot neighborhood recreation center and 1,100 housing units.

Politics

Following his release from prison in 1895, ARU President Debs became a committed advocate of socialism, helping in 1897 to launch the Social Democracy of America, a forerunner of the Socialist Party of America. He ran for president in 1900 for the first of five times as head of the Socialist Party ticket.

Civil as well as criminal charges were brought against the organizers of the strike and Debs in particular, and the Supreme Court issued a unanimous decision, In re Debs, that rejected Debs' actions.  The Illinois Governor John P. Altgeld was incensed at Cleveland for putting the federal government at the service of the employers, and for rejecting Altgeld's plan to use his state militia rather than federal troops to keep order.

Cleveland's administration appointed a national commission to study the causes of the 1894 strike; it found George Pullman's paternalism partly to blame and described the operations of his company town to be "un-American". The report condemned Pullman for refusing to negotiate and for the economic hardships he created for workers in the town of Pullman. "The aesthetic features are admired by visitors, but have little money value to employees, especially when they lack bread." The State of Illinois filed suit, and in 1898 the Illinois Supreme Court forced the Pullman Company to divest ownership in the town, as its company charter did not authorize such operations. The town was annexed to Chicago. Much of it is now designated as an historic district, which is listed on the National Register of Historic Places.

Labor Day
In 1894, in an effort to conciliate organized labor after the strike, President Grover Cleveland and Congress designated Labor Day as a federal holiday in contrast with the more radical May 1st. Legislation for the holiday was pushed through Congress six days after the strike ended. Samuel Gompers, who had sided with the federal government in its effort to end the strike by the American Railway Union, spoke out in favor of the holiday.

See also

 United States labor law
 History of rail transport in the United States
 Murder of workers in labor disputes in the United States

References

Sources and further reading
 Bassett, Johnathan "The Pullman Strike of 1894," OAH Magazine of History, Volume 11, Issue 2, Winter 1997, Pages 34–41,  a lesson plan for high schools
 Cooper, Jerry M. "The army as strikebreaker—the railroad strikes of 1877 and 1894." Labor History 18.2 (1977): 179–196.
 DeForest, Walter S. The Periodical Press and the Pullman Strike: An Analysis of the Coverage and Interpretation of the Railroad Strike of 1894 by Eight Journals of Opinion and Reportage MA thesis. University of Wisconsin, Madison, 1973.
 Eggert, Gerald G. Railroad labor disputes: the beginnings of federal strike policy (U of Michigan Press, 1967).
 Ginger, Ray. The Bending Cross: A Biography of Eugene V. Debs. (1949). online
 Hirsch, Susan Eleanor. After the Strike: A Century of Labor Struggle at Pullman. (U of Illinois Press, 2003).
Laughlin, Rosemary. The Pullman strike of 1894 (2006) online, for high schools
 Lindsey, Almont. The Pullman Strike: The Story of a Unique Experiment and of a Great Labor Upheaval. Chicago: University of Chicago Press, 1943. online, a standard history
 Lindsey, Almont. "Paternalism and the Pullman Strike," American Historical Review, Vol. 44, No. 2 (Jan., 1939), pp. 272–89 
 Nevins, Allan Nevins. Grover Cleveland: A Study in  Courage. (1933) pp. 611–28
 Novak, Matt. "Blood on the Tracks in Pullman: Chicagoland's Failed Capitalist Utopia" (2014) Gizmodo.com online
 Papke, David Ray. The Pullman Case: The Clash of Labor and Capital in Industrial America. Lawrence, KS: University Press of Kansas, 1999.
 Reiff, Janice L. "Rethinking Pullman: Urban Space and Working-Class Activism" Social Science History (2000) 24#1 pp. 7–32 online
 Rondinone, Troy. "Guarding the Switch: Cultivating Nationalism During the Pullman Strike," Journal of the Gilded Age & Progressive Era (2009) 8(1): 83–109. 
 Salvatore, Nick. Eugene V. Debs: Citizen and Socialist. Urbana, IL: University of Illinois Press, 1984. online
 Schneirov, Richard, et al. (eds.) The Pullman Strike and the Crisis of the 1890s: Essays on Labor and Politics. (U of Illinois Press, 1999). online
 Smith, Carl. Urban Disorder and the Shape of Belief: The Great Chicago Fire, the Haymarket Bomb, and the Model Town of Pullman. Chicago: University of Chicago Press, 1995.
 White, Richard. Railroaded: the transcontinentals and the making of modern America (WW Norton, 2011), pp 429–450.
 Winston, A.P. "The Significance of the Pullman Strike," Journal of Political Economy, vol. 9, no. 4 (Sept. 1901), pp. 540–61. 
 Wish, Harvey. "The Pullman Strike: A Study in Industrial Warfare," Journal of the Illinois State Historical Society (1939) 32#3 pp. 288–312

Primary sources
 Cleveland, Grover. The Government and the Chicago Strike of 1894 [1904]. Princeton, NJ: Princeton University Press, 1913.
 Manning, Thomas G. and David M. Potter, eds. Government and the American Economy, 1870 to the Present (1950) pp 117–160.
  United States Strike Commission, Report on the Chicago Strike of June–July, 1894. Washington, DC: Government Printing Office, 1895. 54pp of history and 680pp of documents, testimony and recommendations
 Warne, Colston E.  ed. The Pullman Boycott 1894: The problem of Federal Intervention (1955) 113pp.

External links

 Pullman Strike Timeline
 Chicago Strike
 The Pullman Strike, Illinois During the Gilded Age 1866–1894, Illinois Historical Digitization Projects at Northern Illinois University Libraries

Riots and civil disorder in Illinois
1894 in Illinois
1894 labor disputes and strikes
History of rail transportation in the United States
Labor disputes in Illinois
Transportation labor disputes in the United States
Socialism in the United States
1894 riots
Rail transportation labor disputes in the United States
1894 in rail transport
Progressive Era in the United States
Pullman Company
May 1894 events
Labor relations by company